Itoto Maimy (Cumanogota, Cumaná, Kumaná); also Chaima (Chayma), Cumanagoto, Waikeri, Palank, Pariagoto or tamanaku is an endangered Cariban language of eastern coastal Venezuela. It was the language of the Cumanagoto people and other nations. Extinct dialects, include Palenque (presumably Palank), Piritu (Piritugoto), and Avaricoto (Guildea 1998).

Notes

Cariban languages
Extinct languages of South America